Hyblaea paulianii is a moth in the family Hyblaeidae described by Viette in 1961.

References

Hyblaeidae